Ablepharus rueppellii, known commonly as Rüppell's snake-eyed skink, is a species of skink found in the Middle East. It was formerly considered a subspecies of Ablepharus kitaibelii, but has since been distinguished. What is currently recognized as this species is possibly two distinct species.

Range
It is found throughout north and central Israel, Lebanon, western Jordan, and the Sinai Peninsula of Egypt. It also possibly lives in Syria, though this is also unconfirmed. In the areas where it can be found, it is generally uncommon. It is found in the leaf litter of forested or shrubby areas, and in Egypt, it is usually found near oases. It is highly localized in densely vegetated areas.

In Israel, the species is common and can be found in cities. It is one of the few reptiles capable of living in areas afforested with Aleppo pine (these are very widespread in Israel).

Possible threats
Few threats exist to the species as a whole, though deforestation and loss of traditionally farmed orchards may affect specific populations. The species is protected by legislation in Israel.

References

Further reading
Gray, J.E. 1839. Catalogue of the slender-tongued saurians, with descriptions of many new genera and species. Ann. Mag. Nat. Hist. (1)2: 331–337 (287–293)
Lymberakis, P. and Kalionzopoulou, A. 2003. Additions to the herpetofauna of Syria. Zoology in the Middle East 29: 33–39.
Schmidtler, J.F. 1997. Die Ablepharus kitaibelii - Gruppe in Süd-Anatolien und benachbarten Gebieten (Squamata: Sauria: Scinidae). Herpetozoa 10(1/2):35-63

Ablepharus
Reptiles described in 1839
Reptiles of Western Asia
Fauna of the Middle East
Taxa named by John Edward Gray